The Monasavu Dam is a rock-fill embankment dam on the Nanuku River about  northwest of Suva in Naitasiri Province, Fiji. It is located just above the Monasavu Falls and is both the tallest and largest dam, which also withholds the largest reservoir in the country. The primary purpose of the dam is to produce hydroelectric power and it supports an  power station. To offset fossil fuel imports for power production on the island, the Monasavu-Wailoa Hydroelectric Project was authorized by the Fiji Electricity Authority in 1977 and construction began in May 1978. The dam was complete and power station commissioned in 1983. About US$15 million of the project's total US$234 million cost was supplied by the World Bank, the rest by the host government and loans.

The dam, protection of its catchment and rainforest contribute to its national significance as outlined in Fiji's Biodiversity Strategy and Action Plan.

Wailoa Hydro Power Station
In 1992, the power station was supplying 92% of Viti Levu's, the main Fiji island, power. This share dropped to 49% in 2006 due to growing power demand.

See also

Nadarivatu Dam

References

Hydroelectric power stations in Fiji
Dams completed in 1983
Dams in Fiji
Rock-filled dams
Naitasiri Province
Preliminary Register of Sites of National Significance in Fiji